William Weston III (fl. 1415–1447) of Ockham, Surrey, was an English politician.

Family
He was the son of William Weston, MP for Surrey, and his son, John Weston, was also an MP. The Weston family were prominent in the area.

Career
He was a Member of the Parliament of England for Guildford in 1415, 1419, 1423 and 1431, and then for Surrey in 1447.

References 

Members of the Parliament of England for Surrey
14th-century births
People from Surrey
English MPs 1415
15th-century deaths
Members of Parliament for Guildford
English MPs 1419
English MPs 1423
English MPs 1431